←2004 - 2005 - 2006→

This is a list of Japanese television dramas often called doramas by fans.

2005 Spring Season
Series

2005 Summer Season
Series

2005 Fall Season
Series

 Gokusen 2 - starring Yukie Nakama, Kazuya Kamenashi, Jin Akanishi and Teppei Koike
  (H2～君といた日々) - starring Takayuki Yamada, Yui Ichikawa and Ishihara Satomi
 Sh15uya - starring Saya Yuki and Yui Aragaki

See also
 List of Japanese television dramas

 List of Japanese Television Dramas
Dramas, 2005